V. D. Zalavadiya (born 1 February 1961) is an Indian politician. He is a former member of the Gujarat Legislative Assembly from the Kamrej Assembly constituency from 2017 to 2022. He is associated with the Bharatiya Janata Party.

References 

1961 births
Members of the Gujarat Legislative Assembly
Bharatiya Janata Party politicians
Living people